Silent ball is the Psi Chi national game in which a ball (representing the psyche) is thrown from player to player (representing cheires) while everyone remains silent. The game was created to stimulate interpersonal relationships, stemming from experiments by Philip G. Zimbardo. 

There may be variations and additions to these rules.  For example, if players who are sitting down, because they are "out", are able to catch a throw, then they may re-enter the play.  If the ball is tossed inaccurately or in an aggressive manner, then the person who threw the ball is "out". Other adaptations include disallowing players from returning the ball to the players from whom they have immediately received it (except in cases where only two players remain in the game) imposing time limits on how long players may hold the ball before being required to pass it and the teacher of the class joining in.

Silent ball also goes by "Silent Desk Ball" or "Mum ball" by some people

The students are usually the players while the teacher is usually a referee though it is semi-common for the teacher to join as a player. In some instances, the teacher is allowed to cheat in the game.

Some common strategies are "Snake eyes" where somebody looks at one player and throws it at somebody else. Though this is sometimes a banned rule, there is also "whipping" the ball where a player throws the ball as hard as possible. In some instances, two players will sit on the same desk and be a team, though this is an uncommon occurrence.

References

Children's games
Classroom games